Șagului is one of the largest and most populated districts of Timișoara. It is located in the southern part of the city, being crossed by the homonymous road (Calea Șagului) that connects the city with Șag. Șagului is considered the first neighborhood of blocks of flats in the city, created for labor migration produced when the communist regime decided to accelerate industrialization. Along the road, in the 1960s, collective houses of Soviet architecture with 8 and 10 floors were built, which had a propagandistic role, suggesting the greatness of communism.

At the exit from the city, on Calea Șagului, an industrial area with production halls was developed. There are also several shopping centers and showrooms of major car manufacturers.

References 

Districts of Timișoara